Holyhead Lighthouse may refer to one of two Holyhead, Wales lighthouses:
Holyhead Breakwater Lighthouse
Holyhead Mail Pier Light